"Every Little Bit Hurts" was originally a 1964 hit single for Motown soul singer Brenda Holloway, written by Ed Cobb.

Background
Though she was against recording the song again (she recorded it a couple of years before signing with Motown), she reluctantly recorded the song  and the label released it in the summer of the year. "Every Little Bit Hurts" was a big hit peaking at No. 13 on the Billboard Hot 100, and became one of Holloway's trademark singles.

Covers
 The Spencer Davis Group version reached No. 41 in the UK in early 1965. and No. 9 in Canada in 1967.
In 1968, Small Faces recorded the song and included on "The BBC Sessions" LP.
 Released in October 1976, it was covered by Graeme "Shirley" Strachan (lead singer of Skyhooks) as his debut solo release and peaked at No. 3 on the Australian Kent Music Report Singles Charts.
 British band The Clash recorded a cover of the song in 1980 for Sandinista!, but the track didn't make it onto the album.  It was instead released in 1991 on the box set Clash on Broadway.

Chart history
Brenda Holloway

Spencer Davis Group

Graeme "Shirley" Strachan

Weekly charts

Year-end charts

Alicia Keys version

"Every Little Bit Hurts" was included by American recording artist Alicia Keys on her live album, Unplugged (2005). It was released as the album's second and last single in 2006. It failed to enter the US and international charts.

Critical reception
Sal Cinquemani from Slant Magazine felt that Keys treated the song "like [a] vocal audition[...] and not the blank canvas[...] of an interpretive artist".

Music video
Directed by Justin Francis, the video premiered on January 17, 2006 on BET's 106 & Park.

Track listing
US promotional CD single
 "Every Little Bit Hurts" (Radio Edit) – 3:58
 "Every Little Bit Hurts" (Call Out Hook) – 0:10
 "Every Little Bit Hurts" (Radio Edit) (MP3 format) – 3:58

References

External links 

1964 singles
1965 singles
1976 singles
2006 singles
Brenda Holloway songs
Alicia Keys songs
Songs written by Ed Cobb
Motown singles
Small Faces songs
Soul ballads
Rhythm and blues ballads
1964 songs
Teena Marie songs